Paul Mosley is an American Republican politician and a former member of the Arizona House of Representatives elected to represent District 5 in 2016 through 2019.

Education
Mosley graduated from Brigham Young University with a financial services degree in 2006.

Political career
In 2016, Mosley and incumbent Regina Cobb defeated Sam Medrano and Jennifer Jones in the Republican primary for District 5 of the Arizona House of Representatives. Mosley and Cobb went on to defeat Democrat Beth Weisser and Leo Biasiucci of the Green Party in the general election.

In 2017, Mosley announced that he wanted to abolish compulsory education for children in Arizona, on the grounds that "education is still a privilege".

Speeding controversy
In March 2018, Mosley was pulled over for driving  in a  zone. In July 2018 the body cam footage was released to the public. Mosley later apologized on Facebook.

Doug Ducey (R), the governor of Arizona, called for an end to legislative immunity based on Mosley's behavior.

Re-election bid
In August 2018, Mosley and Cobb were challenged in the Republican primary by Leo Biasiucci, a businessman who ran as a Green Party candidate in 2012, and Jennifer Jones-Esposito, first vice chair of the La Paz County Republican Committee. Mosley came third behind  Cobb and Biasiucci and was eliminated from standing for a second term in the general election.

Personal 
Mosley and his wife Brynley have seven children, all born between 2007 and 2017.

References

External links
Information at Ballotpedia
5th district website
Official campaign site

Republican Party members of the Arizona House of Representatives
Living people
Year of birth missing (living people)